In human anatomy, and in mammals in general, the mons pubis or pubic mound (also known simply as the mons, and known specifically in females as the mons Venus or mons veneris) is a rounded mass of fatty tissue found over the pubic symphysis of the pubic bones.

Anatomy
For females, the mons pubis forms the anterior portion of the vulva. It divides into the labia majora (literally "larger lips"), on either side of the furrow known as the pudendal cleft, that surrounds the labia minora, clitoris, urethra, vaginal opening, and other structures of the vulval vestibule.

Although present in both men and women, the mons pubis tends to be larger in women. Its fatty tissue is sensitive to estrogen, causing a distinct mound to form with the onset of female puberty. This pushes the forward portion of the labia majora out and away from the pubic bone. The mound also becomes covered with pubic hair. It often becomes less prominent with the decrease in bodily estrogen experienced during menopause.

Etymology 
The term mons pubis is derived from Latin for "pubic mound". The more specifically female mons Venus or mons veneris is derived from Latin for "mound of Venus".

Society and culture 

Although not part of external genitalia itself, the pubic mound can be regarded as an erogenous zone and is highly eroticized in many cultures. Throughout history, the complete or partial removal of pubic hair has been common in many societies, and more recently it has become widespread in the Western world. The full removal of pubic hair by use of wax, sugar or shaving, known as ″Brazilian wax″, has become common practice in recent years.

In some circumstances, the mons veneris is subjected to aesthetic ideals beyond hair removal. Correspondingly, plastic surgery is offered which alters the shape of the mons to a desired ideal. Desired ideals may be influenced by personal preferences, current cultural norms, or societal pressures.

Permanent forms of decoration to enhance the aesthetic appeal of this area are hanabira, the application of cosmetic scars, or piercings such as the Christina piercing or the Nefertiti piercing. Vajazzling refers to the non-permanent decoration of the mons pubis with crystal ornaments.

References

Bibliography
Sloane, Ethel. Biology of Women. Cengage Learning 2002, p. 31
Gray, Henry: Anatomy of the Human Body. Lea & Febiger, 1918 
"Mons pubis"  in Encyclopædia Britannica Online. 2010.

External links
 
 

Pelvis
Sexual anatomy